The 1958 Pittsburgh Panthers football team represented the University of Pittsburgh in the 1958 NCAA University Division football season.  The team compiled a 5–4–1 record under head coach John Michelosen.

Schedule

References

Pittsburgh
Pittsburgh Panthers football seasons
Pittsburgh Panthers football